Jes Fan is an artist born in Canada and raised in Hong Kong, currently based in Brooklyn, New York. Their work looks at the intersection of biology and identity, and explores otherness, kinship, queerness and diasporic politics. Fan has exhibited in the United States, UK, Hong Kong, and others.

Biography 

Jes Fan grew up in Hong Kong after being born in Canada shortly after his parents immigrated in 1989. Fan's parents moved from Hong Kong after the Tiananmen Square protests, hoping to find a safer life. Without speaking English, they had great difficulty surviving and soon returned to their native Hong Kong. Fan, who identifies as a transgender man, describes Hong Kong as a very oppressive place to grow up, with little to no representation of queer individuals or community. 
Fan holds a BFA in Glass from Rhode Island School of Design and their current studio practice and residence is in Brooklyn, NY. .

Work 

Speculating on the fraught intersection between biology and identity, Fan's practice emerges from a haptic inquiry into the concept of otherness. Primarily working in the field of  sculpture, Fan navigate the slippery complexities of identity as guided by the signifiers embedded in his mediums. In his sculptures, Fan work with biological substances such that of estrogen, testosterone, e.coli, melanin or blood; as well as more traditional sculptural materials such as glass, silicone and resin. Fan speaks to the transformative nature of glass as the main reason for its longevity and primary use as a material in his artwork. As a trained glass blower, witnessing the states of flux of glass was what first inspired Fan to experiment with other types of transformative materials.

In a review of Fan's work, contemporary art periodical Artforum states,

"Above all, (Fan's) sculptures were promiscuously biomorphic, resembling molecules, organs, orifices, skin, bodies of all kins--wringling forms of life that refuse any single definition."

Online contemporary art broker  Artsy 
has commented that:

"Fan's desire is to obfuscate the difference between hard and soft, asking us to quantify and justify our sense of queerness as a limp thing. It's a conceptual question for the viewer: How soft must a masculine object get to become feminine?"

Fan has been featured in an ongoing series of short interviews for PBS's Art21 in their New York Closeup series. In the second short following Fan, titled “Infectious Beauty”, Art21 followed the artist in the production of their sculpture for the 2019 Socrates Sculpture Biennial, ‘what eye no see, no can do’, a series of interconnecting metal rods and slumping fiberglass bodies.

Mother is a Woman (2018) 

The piece Mother is a Woman (2018), includes a lotion with estrogen extracted from the artists’ mother's urine, performance elements, and a related promotional video. Upon created of the estrogen cream, Jes Fan both applied this estrogenized cream to his own skin as well as distributing it to participants that were outside of his family to apply to their skin. With these actions he is complicating hereditary nature of this hormone, and subverting how we think of its role in the human body. Jes states,

“If you are feminized by my mother’s estrogen, who are you to her and who is she to you? What if I re-feminize my masculinized body? Is that natural? How do we make these complications clear? Also, my mother’s femininity is manufactured by the fact that she takes estrogen for her menopause. There are more than pharmaceutical entanglements and a more nuanced way of thinking between what we present as an authentic self and reality.” (Jes Fan) Systems (2018) Systems (2018), is a body of work consisting of sculptural lattices with glass globules that hanging off of them. The blown glass shapes serve as containers for biological substances that were added after their construction. In constructing these forms, Jes Fan first pours silicone into the openings in each vessel, and then injects each of them with melanin, estrogen, testosterone, or fat. The transparent medium of glass serves as a material barrier that makes the viewer feel close to these materials while at the same time very aware that they are separated from their original source of the human body. Fan’s conceptual interest in this work is taking substances that are politicized when attached to the body and yet become absurd and abstracted once they are separated from it.“Playing with these substances I want to see it detach from the body and existing on their own. once their removed from the body, the site of identification, what are they?” (Jes Fan)

List of exhibitions

Solo exhibitions 
Sites of Wounding, Empty Gallery, Art Basel Hong Kong, Hong Kong (2023)

Mother is a Woman, Empty Gallery, Hong Kong (2018)

No Clearance in Niche, Museum of Arts and Design, New York (2017)

Disposed to Add, Vox Populi Gallery, Philadelphia (2017)

Ot(her), Sarah Doyle Gallery, Brown University, Rhode Island (2016)

Selected group exhibitions 

The Milk of Dreams, Venice Biennale, Venice, Italy (2022)

Soft Water, Hard Stone, New Museum Triennial, New York (2022)

Networks, Liverpool Biennale, England, (2021)

Kiss My Genders, Hayward Gallery, Southbank Art Center, London (2019)

An Opera for Animals, Rockbund Art Museum, Shanghai

In my room, Antenna Space, Shanghai

SportCult, Team Gallery, NYC

Paradox: The Body in the Age of AI, Miller ICA, Carnegie Mellon University

Uproot, Smack Mellon, New York (2017)

Glass Ceiling, UrbanGlass, New York (2017)

Timeshare, Zaha Hadid Building, New York (2018)

Set on Freedom, Queens Museum, New York (2017)

In Search of Miss Ruthless, Para Site, Hong Kong (2017)

From Dada to Tada, Fisher Parrish Gallery, Brooklyn, New York (2017)

Whereabouts, Glazenhuis Museum, Belgium (2016)

Awards and residencies 
Fan is the recipient of awards including the NYSCA/NYFA Fellowship (Sculpture/Craft) 2020, Joan Mitchell Painters and Sculptors Grant 2017, Jerome Hill Fellowship 2019-2020, Edward and Sally Van Lier Fellowship at Museum of Arts and Design (MAD), CCGA Fellowship at Wheaton Arts, and John A. Chironna Memorial Award at RISD.

He has taken part in residencies including Smack Mellon Artist Studio Program in Brooklyn (2019), Para Site in Hong Kong (2017), Recess Art Session Artist in Residence, Bemis Center for Contemporary Arts Residency, Pioneer Works Residency, Rhode Island School of Design Glass (2017), Pioneer Works (2017), Spring Workshop in Hong Kong,.. He was awarded the Pollock-Krasner Foundation Grant in 2022.

References 

Year of birth missing (living people)
Living people
21st-century Canadian artists
Hong Kong artists
Canadian expatriates in the United States
Rhode Island School of Design alumni
Queer artists
Canadian LGBT artists
21st-century Canadian LGBT people